The 2006–07 A-League was the 30th season of top-flight soccer in Australia, and the second season of the A-League since its establishment the previous season. Football Federation Australia hoped to build on the success of the first season and on the interest generated by the Socceroos competing in the 2006 FIFA World Cup. Fox Sports had signed a A$120 million deal over 7 years for the exclusive broadcast rights of the A-League, AFC Champions League, and national team matches (excluding matches played in the World Cup finals).

The television advertisement campaign used for the 2006–07 season was the same as the previous season, with different music. Scribe's song "Not Many" was replaced with Manuel Neztic's "Kickin Down". The second season was marketed as "A-League: Version 2".

Clubs

Foreign players

The following do not fill a Visa position:
1Those players who were born and started their professional career abroad but have since gained Australian Residency (and New Zealand Residency, in the case of Wellington Phoenix);
2Australian residents (and New Zealand residents, in the case of Wellington Phoenix) who have chosen to represent another national team;
3Injury Replacement Players, or National Team Replacement Players;
4Guest Players (eligible to play a maximum of ten games)

Salary cap exemptions and captains

Pre-Season Challenge Cup

This competition was held in July and August in the lead up to the start of the A-League season.  The opening round was 15 July 2006. The competition featured a group stage, with three regular rounds and a bonus round, followed by a two-week finals playoff.  The bonus group round matched up teams against opponents from the other group, and also offered the incentive of "bonus points" based on goals scored (1 point for 2 goals, 2 points for 3 goals, 3 points for 4 or more goals).

The Pre-Season Cup was used to enhance the A-League's profiles by playing pre-season games in regional centres including the Gold Coast, Sunshine Coast, Toowoomba, Launceston, Canberra, Wollongong, Port Macquarie, Orange and Tamworth.

The pre-season cup was won by Adelaide United at the final on 19 August 2006.

Regular season

The league season took a triple round-robin format, and took place over 21 rounds between 25 August 2006 and 21 January 2007.

League table

Results

Round 1

Round 2

Round 3

Round 4

Round 5

Round 6

Round 7

Round 8

Round 9

Round 10

Round 11

Round 12

Round 13

Round 14

Round 15

Round 16

Round 17

Round 18

Round 19

Round 20

Round 21

Finals series

The Asian Football Confederation announced on 21 November 2006 that Adelaide United and Sydney FC would represent Australia in the 2007 AFC Champions League. Despite an appeal by the Football Federation Australia, it was determined that the 2005–06 A-League premiers and champions would qualify and not those from the current season.

The AFC also indicated that the qualification arrangements would not be reviewed prior to 2009. The FFA have indicated that the premiers and champions of A-League 2006–07 will qualify for the 2008 AFC Champions League – establishing a precedent of maintaining a one-year lag between qualification and participation.

Season statistics

Leading goalscorers

Most yellow cards

Attendances

Highest attendances
 55,436: Melbourne Victory vs Adelaide United, 18 February 2007 (Grand Final)
 50,333: Melbourne Victory vs Sydney FC, 8 December 2006 (Round 16)
 47,413: Melbourne Victory vs Adelaide United, 4 February 2007 (Finals Week 2)
 39,730: Melbourne Victory vs Sydney FC, 2 September 2006 (Round 2)
 32,371: Queensland Roar vs Sydney FC, 20 January 2007 (Round 21)

Awards
The 2007 A-League Awards ceremony was held on 27 February 2007.
 Johnny Warren Medal (Player of the Year): Nick Carle (Newcastle Jets)
 Joe Marston Medal (Best player in Grand Final): Archie Thompson (Melbourne Victory)
 Rising Star (Young Player of the Year): Adrian Leijer (Melbourne Victory)
 Coach of the Year: Ernie Merrick (Melbourne Victory)
 Golden Boot Award: Danny Allsopp (11 goals) (Melbourne Victory)
 Fair Play Award: Perth Glory
 Referee of the Year: Mark Shield

See also
2006–07 Adelaide United season
2006–07 Central Coast Mariners season
2006–07 Melbourne Victory season
2006–07 Newcastle Jets FC season
2006–07 New Zealand Knights season
2006–07 Perth Glory season
2006–07 Queensland Roar season
2006–07 Sydney FC season

Notes

References

External links
A-League official website, including fixtures
Football Federation Australia
SBS The World Game A-League section
FOXSPORTS.com.au A-League section and Official A-League Fantasy competition

 
A-League Men seasons
Aus
1
1